Augustin Yvon Edmond Dubail (15 April 1851 – 7 January 1934) was a French Army general. He commanded the First Army and Army Group East during World War I.

Biography 
Augustin Dubail was born in Belfort on April 15, 1851.  He graduated from the military school of Saint-Cyr in 1870 and was commissioned an officer in the infantry. During the Franco-Prussian War Dubail fought at Saarbrücken, Spicheren, Borny before being captured at Metz. After the war Dubail served as a professor at Saint-Cyr, as an officer on the border and in Algeria, where in 1901 he became colonel of the 3rd Zouaves.

In 1904–1905 Dubail served twice as chief of staff of the French Minister of War Maurice Berteaux. Promoted to brigadier general, Dubail commanded the 53rd Infantry Brigade, the 5th Infantry Brigade and the 14th Infantry Brigade and was commandant of Saint-Cyr (1906–1908) before being appointed to the technical committee of the infantry.

During the Agadir Crisis in 1911 Dubail was Chief of Staff of the Army, reporting to the new War Minister, Adolphe Messimy. Messimy and Dubail tried to have the Army adopt 105mm heavy guns, but French generals saw them as a drag on the offensive (preferring to use the lighter and more mobile "Soixante-Quinze" gun) and better used as a defensive weapon like machine guns, so only a few were in use by 1914. General Victor-Constant Michel, Vice-President of the Supreme War Council and commander-in-chief designate, later claimed that Dubail had privately agreed with his plans to deploy reservists in the front line and to adopt a more defensive war plan; however Michel had to resign when no senior general backed him. Dubail's post was abolished in Messimy's reforms.

In 1912 Dubail was given command of the IX Corps and in 1914 he became a member of the Supreme War Council.

When the war broke out Dubail was given command of the First Army, which would start the invasion of Germany by taking Lorraine together with de Castelnau's Second Army. The armies met strong German resistance and were repulsed out of Lorraine with heavy casualties. They were able to reform and defend the French border against a German attack.

In 1915 he was promoted to commander of Army Group East (G.A.E) on the Western Front, around Belfort and Verdun. He became convinced that a major German offensive was coming against Verdun. He called for reinforcements and heavy artillery and the new Allie tanks for the Verdun sector, but the French commander-in-chief, Joseph Joffre, wasn't convinced that an attack was imminent.

When the German offensive began at Verdun, Joffre partly blamed Dubail, who was fired in March 1916, publicly humiliated. He claimed to have been made a scapegoat for Joffre's lack of foresight, although he had himself public played down the likelihood of a German attack at Verdun.  Dubail was hired again in April 1916, becoming military governor of Paris, a position he kept until June 1918, when he was replaced by General Guillaumat. Dubail died on January 7, 1934, aged 82.

Decorations 
Légion d'honneur
Knight (24 June 1886)
Officer (11 July 1900)
Commander (30 December 1905)
Grand Officer (30 December 1911)
Grand Cross (18 September 1914)
Médaille militaire (8 October 1915)
Croix de guerre 1914–1918 with 3 palms
 Commemorative medal of the 1870–1871 War
Médaille Interalliée de la Victoire 1914-1918
Médaille Commémorative de la Grande Guerre
 War Cross (Belgium)
Distinguished Service Medal (US)
Honorary Knight Grand Cross of the Order of St Michael and St George (UK)
Officer of Nichan Iftikhar (Tunisia)
Grand Cross of St. Stanislas
Grand Cross of the White Eagle
Grand Cross of the Crown
Grand Cross of the Sacred Treasure
Grand Cross of the Rising Sun

References

General references 
 David F. Burg & L. Edward Purcell, Almanac of World War I, The University Press of Kentucky, 1998.
 Christopher Clark, The Sleepwalkers: How Europe Went to War in 1914, Allen Lane, Penguin, 2012.
 .
 Biography of Augustin Dubail.
 Base Léonore for his records concerning the Légion d'honneur (French decoration).

External links 
 

1851 births
1934 deaths
Military personnel from Belfort
French generals
French military personnel of World War I
Military governors of Paris
Grand Croix of the Légion d'honneur
Recipients of the Croix de Guerre 1914–1918 (France)
Grand Chanceliers of the Légion d'honneur
Recipients of the Distinguished Service Medal (US Army)
Honorary Knights Grand Cross of the Order of St Michael and St George
Foreign recipients of the Distinguished Service Medal (United States)
École Spéciale Militaire de Saint-Cyr commandants